City of Angels is an American medical drama television series which ran for two seasons on CBS from January 16 to December 21, 2000. It was network television's first medical drama with a predominantly African American cast.

Synopsis
The show centered on the professional and personal lives of the doctors and nurses at Angels of Mercy Hospital in Los Angeles, California. While the show brought about familiar faces (Vivica A. Fox, Blair Underwood and Michael Warren), it was a launching point for actors Hill Harper, Gabrielle Union and Maya Rudolph. The show was cancelled in December 2000.

Cast

Main
 Blair Underwood as Dr. Ben Turner
 Vivica A. Fox as Dr. Lillian Price (season 1)
 Michael Warren as Ron Harris
 Hill Harper as Dr. Wesley Williams 
 Phil Buckman as Dr. Geoffrey Weiss
 T. E. Russell as Dr. Arthur Jackson
 Viola Davis as Surgical Nurse Lynette Peeler 
 Maya Rudolph as Nurse Grace Patterson (season 1; recurring season 2)
 Robert Morse as Edwin "Ed" O'Malley (season 1; recurring season 2)
 Gabrielle Union as Dr. Courtney Ellis (season 2)
 Gregory Alan Williams as Dr. Nathan Ambrose (season 2)
 Kyle Secor as Dr. Raleigh Stewart (season 2)

Recurring
 Tamara Taylor as Dr. Ana Syphax
 Harold Sylvester as Wendell Loman

Episodes

Season 1 (2000)

Season 2 (2000)

References

External links 
 

2000s American black television series
2000s American drama television series
2000s American medical television series
2000 American television series debuts
2000 American television series endings
CBS original programming
English-language television shows
Television shows set in Los Angeles
Television series by CBS Studios
Television series created by Steven Bochco